Susan Jane Edelman (née Cable; August 12, 1957) is a Canadian politician. She represented the electoral district of Riverdale South in the Yukon Legislative Assembly from 1996 to 2002. She was a member of the Yukon Liberal Party. She served as Women's Issues Minister, Health Minister and Social Services Minister.

She resigned her post in 2002 after an e-mail she had written sparked controversy. In 2008, she was a Yukon returning officer.

References

1957 births
Living people
Politicians from Whitehorse
Politicians from Toronto
Women MLAs in Yukon
Yukon Liberal Party MLAs